is a railway station on the Kagoshima Main Line operated by JR Kyushu in Koga, Fukuoka Prefecture, Japan.

Lines

Layout
The station consists of two island platforms serving four tracks. Two sidings branch off track 4.

Adjacent stations

History
When the Kyushu Railway was nationalized on 1 July 1907, Japanese Government Railways (JGR) took over control of the station. On 12 October 1909, the station became part of the Hitoyoshi Main Line and then on 21 November 1909, part of the Kagoshima Main Line. With the privatization of Japanese National Railways (JNR), the successor of JGR, on 1 April 1987, JR Kyushu took over control of the station.

Passenger statistics
In fiscal 2016, the station was used by 6,662 passengers daily, and it ranked 27th among the busiest stations of JR Kyushu.

See also 
List of railway stations in Japan

References

External links
Koga Station (JR Kyushu)

Railway stations in Fukuoka Prefecture
Railway stations in Japan opened in 1890